Sarmashevo (Sarmaş) is a rural locality (a village) in Vostretsovsky Selsoviet, Burayevsky District, Bashkortostan, Russia. The population was 11 as of 2010. There are 2 streets.

Geography 
Sarmashevo is located 47 km south of Burayevo (the district's administrative centre) by road. Toktarovo is the nearest rural locality.

References 

Rural localities in Burayevsky District